Mount Heekin is a large, ice-free mountain overlooking the north side of the mouth of Baldwin Glacier where the latter enters Shackleton Glacier, Antarctica. It was discovered and photographed by U.S. Navy Operation Highjump on the flights of February 16, 1947, and named by the Advisory Committee on Antarctic Names for Lieutenant Robert P. Heekin, U.S. Navy, the navigator of Flight 8.

References

Mountains of the Ross Dependency
Dufek Coast